Mahinur Özdemir (born 7 November 1982 in Schaerbeek) is a Belgian politician, with dual nationality (Turkish – Belgian). She is youngest and first female member of parliament with Hijab. She was expelled from Humanist Democratic Centre (cdH) for denying the Armenian genocide in 2015.

Biography 
She can speak French, Flemish, English, Turkish and Spanish. At first she wanted to study law, but as she reckoned that she wouldn't be able to litigate in court while wearing a Hijab, she changed her mind. She holds a degree in political science, public administration guidance (Free University of Brussels). She is also an active member of many NGOs in Schaerbeek and the founder of a student organization. In 2006, she was elected as municipal councilor in the municipality of Schaerbeek. She joined the Christian Democratic Party in Brussels in 2009 and elected as member of the Brussels Regional Parliament on 7 June 2009. She was the first woman to wear the headscarf in a Belgian parliamentary assembly. On 30 July 2010 she married Rahmi Goktas, a Turkish parliamentary attaché of the Justice and Development (AKP) Party. In July 2018, she announced she wouldn't run in the local elections in October 2018.

Political positions

Armenian Genocide denial
Ozdemir was expelled from her party, the Humanist Democratic Centre on 29 May 2015 because she denied the Armenian Genocide committed by the Ottoman Empire was a genocide. She also didn't attend a moment of silence in memory for the victims of the Armenian genocide in parliament, defending herself that there were no court rulings that undermined the Armenian claims. Ozdemir claimed this to be freedom of speech. This is against the party’s deontological bylaws and CDH Chairman Benoit Lutgen had formerly stated that all genocide deniers within the party would be expelled. In protest of this decision, two other members of the cdH, one of them the brother of Mahinur, also left the party alleging the party underwent a shift to the right. Ozdemir immediately received support from the Justice and Development (AKP) Party office in Brussels. There also was a demonstration in support of Ozdemir by the AKP-affiliated , beginning at the headquarters of her former party and ending at the Turkish embassy.

References 

1982 births
Living people
Belgian people of Turkish descent
Centre démocrate humaniste politicians
Université libre de Bruxelles alumni
Members of the Parliament of the Brussels-Capital Region
People from Schaerbeek
Deniers of the Armenian genocide
21st-century Belgian politicians
21st-century Belgian women politicians
Ambassadors of Turkey to Algeria